The Hunchback of Notre Dame is a 1939 American romantic drama film starring Charles Laughton and Maureen O'Hara. Directed by William Dieterle and produced by Pandro S. Berman, the film is based on Victor Hugo's 1831 novel. The film is also noted for being the first film ever shown at the Cannes Film Festival before the festival was postponed due to World War II.

Plot
In Paris during the late Middle Ages, Louis XI, the King of France, and his Chief Justice of Paris, Jehan Frollo, visit a printing shop. Frollo is determined to do everything in his power to protect Paris from anything he sees as evil, including the printing press and gypsies. That day is Paris' annual celebration, the Feast of Fools. Pierre Gringoire, a poor street poet, does a play in front of an audience until it is interrupted by Clopin, the King of the Beggars. Esmeralda, a young gypsy girl, is seen dancing in front of an audience of people. Quasimodo, the hunchback and bell ringer of Notre Dame Cathedral, is crowned the King of Fools until Frollo catches up to him and takes him back to the church.

Esmeralda is caught by a guard and seeks safety in Notre Dame. She prays to the Virgin Mary to help her fellow gypsies only to be confronted by Frollo, who accuses her of being a heathen. Frollo then takes her up to the bell tower where they encounter Quasimodo. As she runs away from the hunchback, Frollo commands Quasimodo to chase after her and kidnap her. Gringoire witnesses all this, and calls out to Captain Phoebus and his guards, who capture Quasimodo just in time and save Esmeralda. Quasimodo is sentenced to be lashed in the square and publicly humiliated afterwards. He asks the Parisian townspeople for water, which Esmeralda gives him.

Later that night, Frollo shows up to a party where Esmeralda is performing and confesses his lust for her. Afterwards, Frollo catches her and Phoebus sharing a moment in the garden. Frollo kills Phoebus out of jealousy and sentences Esmeralda to death for the crime, saying that she has "bewitched" him. Just as she is about to be hanged, Quasimodo saves her by taking her to the cathedral and claiming the right of sanctuary.

When Gringoire and Clopin realize that the nobles are planning to revoke Notre Dame's right of sanctuary, they both try different methods in order to save Esmeralda from hanging: Gringoire writes a pamphlet, and Clopin leads the beggars to storm the cathedral. At the Palace of Justice, Louis realizes that the pamphlet is creating public opinion, which can influence kings to make decisions. The Archbishop arrives to inform Louis of Notre Dame's attack and that Esmeralda is innocent, Louis demands to know who the real murderer is, upon which Frollo confesses his crime and walks away, leaving Louis shocked. Louis orders Olivier to arrest Frollo and then talks to Gringoire after reading his pamphlet. Quasimodo and the guards of Paris fight off Clopin and the beggars. Frollo attempts to kill Quasimodo with a dagger, but Quasimodo stops him and throws Frollo off the cathedral top, sending him down to his death.

Later that morning, King Louis pardons Esmeralda and the other Romani. She leaves the public square with her true love Gringoire and a huge cheering crowd. Quasimodo sees all this from high on the cathedral and asks a gargoyle, "Why was I not made of stone, like thee?"

Cast

 Charles Laughton as Quasimodo
 Sir Cedric Hardwicke as Frollo
 Thomas Mitchell as Clopin
 Maureen O'Hara as Esmeralda
 Edmond O'Brien as Gringoire
 Alan Marshal as Phoebus
 Walter Hampden as Archbishop
 Harry Davenport as King Louis XI
 Katharine Alexander as Madame de Lys
 George Zucco as Procurator
 Fritz Leiber as Old Nobleman
 Etienne Girardot as Doctor
 Helene Whitney as Fleur de Lys
 Mina Gombell as Queen of Beggars
 Arthur Hohl as Olivier
 Curt Bois as Student
 George Tobias as Beggar
 Rod La Rocque as Phillippe
 Spencer Charters as Court Clerk
 Kathryn Adams as Fleur's Companion
 Dianne Hunter as Fleur's Companion
 Siegfried Arno as Tailor
 Peter Godfrey as Monk (uncredited)
 Rondo Hatton as Ugly Man (uncredited)
 Paul Newlan as Whipper (uncredited)

Production
In 1932, it was reported by The Hollywood Reporter that Universal announced that it would remake the 1923 Hunchback of Notre Dame film with John Huston writing a script and that Boris Karloff would play Quasimodo.

Irving Thalberg, who was an uncredited producer in the 1923 film, considered remaking the film in 1934 and even discussed the idea with Charles Laughton. Two years later, Universal regained interest in a remake, with a fan poll being instrumental in influencing the studio to make the film. Ronald Colman, Paul Muni, Fredric March, Lionel Barrymore and Peter Lorre were the choices in the poll and in the end, Universal decided to go with Lorre, even as far as negotiating with the actor to star in the film, but the project never materialized.

A year later, Carl Laemmle, Jr. persuaded Metro-Goldwyn-Mayer to buy the property from Universal as a star-vehicle for Muni. Metro refused and sold the rights to RKO, with Pandro S. Berman producing and William Dieterle directing.

For this production, RKO Radio Pictures built on their movie ranch a massive medieval city of Paris and Notre Dame Cathedral in the San Fernando Valley. This was one of the largest and most extravagant sets ever constructed.

Screenwriter Sonya Levien, who was entrusted to translate Hugo's novel into this film, made the story relevant to the events of the time the film was made: she made the obvious parallel between Paris' persecution of the gypsies and Germany's treatment of the Jews prior to World War II.

Casting
After hearing the news that RKO was going to remake the 1923 film, Lon Chaney, Jr. sought to play the role of Quasimodo and screen-tested for the studio. While the studio felt that Chaney gave excellent performances in his numerous screen tests, other actors would be more suitable for the part, Orson Welles being one of the many considered. Laughton was set to star as Quasimodo, but RKO offered Chaney the role when it seemed like the British actor would be unable to work in America due to troubles with the IRS. Laughton managed to overcome his problems and got the part.

Pleased with her work on Alfred Hitchcock's Jamaica Inn, Laughton brought a then 18-year old Maureen O'Hara to Hollywood to play Esmeralda. This marked O'Hara's American screen debut. According to actress Kathryn Adams, she was supposed to play Esmeralda, but lost the role to O'Hara when Laughton cabled from Ireland to Hollywood that he was "bringing Esmeralda". Adams played a companion of Fleur as compensation for losing the role.

Dieterle wanted Claude Rains to play Frollo, but before he agreed to play the part, he had an unexpected encounter with Laughton on the Universal lot in which Laughton was very condescending. Rains, who had mentored Laughton and John Gielgud at the Royal Academy of Dramatic Arts, later remarked that their encounter at the lot was the end of their relationship and refused to play the role, which would be played by Cedric Hardwicke.

Filming
With a budget of $1.8 million, Hunchback proved to be one of the most expensive movies ever made by the studio. It was shot at the RKO Encino Ranch, with the interiors of the bell tower being shot at the Mudd Hall of Philosophy at the University of Southern California.

The sets of Paris and the Notre Dame Cathedral were constructed by Van Nest Polglase at the cost of $250,000 (about $4,974,622 in 2021 dollars), while Darrell Silvera worked as set decorator. Walter Plunkett oversaw the costume design and Joseph H. August served as cinematographer, this film being the first of his three collaborations with Dieterle.

Filming proved to be difficult for the cast and crew due to the hot temperatures, particularly for Laughton, who had to act with a lot of makeup. In her autobiography, O'Hara recalls one day arriving on the set and finding chimpanzees, baboons and gorillas. Dieterle wanted monks to be on the set but his assistant mistakenly thought he wanted monkeys because of his poor English and thick German accent.

Makeup artist Perc Westmore was loaned by Warner Bros. to RKO for the production. Westmore and Laughton did not get along. Though Westmore wanted to use sponge rubber to make a light appliance for Laughton to wear, Laughton wanted a heavy one to help him stay in character. Laughton was offended when Westmore suggested he try acting like the hump was heavy and was rude and dismissive to Westmore throughout filming. Near the end of the shoot, Westmore called his younger brother to the studio, where he witnessed Westmore, while strapping on the hump, spray Laughton in the face with a seltzer bottle full of quinine water and then kick him in the posterior. Westmore told Laughton, "That's for all the grief you gave me" and added that his brother was a witness and would deny anything Laughton said about the incident.

When Poland was invaded by Nazi Germany on September 1, most of the cast and crew was in a state of fear of what was going to happen. Laughton lightened the mood by reciting the Gettysburg Address (that he had recited in Ruggles of Red Gap). Another incident of emotional filming was the filming of the scene where Quasimodo rings the bells in the tower of the cathedral for Esmeralda. Feeling in pain because his native Britain had declared war on Germany, Laughton rang the bells over and over again until he fell down from exhaustion, overwhelming the crew with emotion.

Censorship
The characters of Claude Frollo and Jehan Frollo are changed from the novel, as was done in the 1923 film. Such changes were made because the filmmakers were concerned that portraying the priest as a villain would violate the policy of the Hays Production Code. In the novel, Claude is depicted as the villainous and 36-year-old Archdeacon of Notre Dame; in the film, he is the good character and much older in age. His younger brother, Jehan, is a teenage and drunken student as well as a juvenile delinquent in the novel; in the film, he is a middle-aged villain who is also Paris' chief justice and a close advisor to King Louis XI.

Award nominations
The film was nominated for two Academy Awards:
 Academy Award for Best Original Music Score  (Alfred Newman)
 Academy Award for Best Sound  (John Aalberg)

The film is recognized by American Film Institute in these lists:
 2002: AFI's 100 Years...100 Passions - #98

Reception
The review aggregator website Rotten Tomatoes reported that 93% of critics have given the film a positive review based on 14 reviews, with an average rating of 8.65/10. Variety called the film a "super thriller-chiller" but found that the elaborate sets tended to overwhelm the story, particularly in the first half. Harrison's Reports wrote, "Very good! Audiences should be thrilled anew by this lavish remake of Victor Hugo's famous novel." Film Daily called it "compelling, dynamic entertainment." John Mosher of The New Yorker wrote that Laughton "achieves something like a tour de force. The lines themselves (such modernisms as 'to buy protection'), along with a perfunctory plot arrangement, are among the weak features of the film, which otherwise is a vivid pictorial drama of fifteenth-century Paris." E. H. Harvey of The Harvard Crimson said that the film "in all is more than entertaining." He said that "the mediocre effects offer a forceful contrast to the great moments" in the film. However, Frank S. Nugent of The New York Times wrote a mostly negative review of the film, finding it "little more" than "a freak show". Though he acknowledged it was "handsome enough of production and its cast is expert," he called it "almost unrelievedly brutal and without the saving grace of unreality which makes Frankenstein's horrors a little comic."

The movie was very popular, earning $1,549,000 in the United States and Canada and $1,646,000 elsewhere, but because of its cost only made a profit of $100,000.

Home media
The Hunchback of Notre Dame was released on DVD in Region 1 on September 21, 2001 by Image Entertainment.  It was issued on Blu-ray in Region A by Warner Home Video on June 9, 2015.

References

External links

 
 
 
 
 

1939 films
1939 romantic drama films
1930s historical drama films
American romantic drama films
American historical drama films
American black-and-white films
Films based on The Hunchback of Notre-Dame
Remakes of American films
Sound film remakes of silent films
Films set in the 1480s
Films set in Paris
Films set in religious buildings and structures
RKO Pictures films
Films directed by William Dieterle
Films produced by Pandro S. Berman
Films with screenplays by Sonya Levien
Films scored by Alfred Newman
Cultural depictions of Louis XI of France
Films about Romani people
1930s English-language films
1930s American films
Films about disability